The Cadillac Aurora is a concept automobile unveiled by Cadillac at the 1990 Chicago Auto Show. It featured a 4.5-liter V-8 engine (273ci (4.5L)) from the Allanté, 4-speed automatic transmission, and all-wheel drive with traction control.

Cadillac would not go on to produce the car, but the name was passed to Oldsmobile. In terms of powertrain concept and interior design, the series production version of it became the Oldsmobile Aurora, unveiled in 1995. Its exterior design carried cues that formed the styling of the European Opel Omega B saloon released in 1994.

The concept appeared in a scene in the movie Demolition Man.

References

External links
Cadillac Aurora (english)

Aurora